James Verini is an American magazine journalist and book author. He is a contributing writer at The New York Times Magazine. He also writes for National Geographic, The New Yorker, Vanity Fair, The Atavist, Foreign Policy, and others. His book They Will Have to Die Now: Mosul and the Fall of the Caliphate was published on September 17, 2019, by W. W. Norton.

Career 
In 2015, he received a National Magazine Award for feature writing for "Love and Ruin," an article in The Atavist about the history of American intervention in Afghanistan. He won a 2015 George Polk Award for "Should the United Nations Wage War to Keep Peace?", about the civil war in Democratic Republic of Congo, in National Geographic.

Bibliography

References

External links
 

Living people
Year of birth missing (living people)
American reporters and correspondents
George Polk Award recipients
The New Yorker people